Girolamo Bartolomeo Bortignon, OFM Cap (31 March 1905 – 12 March 1992) was an Italian prelate of the Roman Catholic Church, serving as Bishop of Padua from 1949 to 1982.

Biography
Born in Romano d'Ezzelino, he was ordained as a Capuchin priest on 3 March 1928, at the age of 22.

On 4 April 1944 he was appointed apostolic administrator of Belluno e Feltre and Titular Bishop of Lydda by Pope Pius XII. Bortignon received his episcopal consecration from Cardinal Adeodato Giovanni Piazza, OCD, on the following 14 May. He later replaced Giosuè Cattarossi as Bishop of Belluno e Feltre on 9 September 1945. In 1947, he named Fr. Albino Luciani, the future Pope John Paul I, as his pro-vicar general.

After almost five years of governing the diocese, Bortignon was translated to Bishop of Padua on 1 April 1949. When Pope John XXIII asked Bortignon for a name for Bishop of Vittorio Veneto, the latter offered his old vicar general in Belluno, Albino Luciani, saying, "I know him ... He will do me fine." In 1960, he told his Vatican connections that the activities surrounding Padre Pio at San Giovanni Rotondo should merit an investigation. Bortignon attended the Second Vatican Council from 1962 to 1965.

He once served as the Vatican's preacher of spiritual exercises and as vice-president of the Triveneto regional Episcopal Conference.

The Capuchin bishop resigned his post in Padua on 7 January 1982, after thirty-two years of service. He later died at age 86.

References

External links
Catholic-Hierarchy 

1905 births
1992 deaths
20th-century Italian Roman Catholic bishops
Bishops of Belluno
Bishops of Padua
Capuchin bishops
Participants in the Second Vatican Council
People from the Province of Vicenza